The Startup Candy Company is the oldest candy company in Utah and one of the oldest candy companies in the United States. William Startup started making candy in his basement in Manchester, England in 1820. He developed the first hard candy and called it “American Cough Candy” because he hoped to bring his new recipe to America one day. However, William died before making it to America, but he left his legacy to his son and namesake. William Startup Jr. learned the candy-making process as a young boy and continued to run his father’s candy business.  

In 1868 William and his new bride immigrated to the United States and made their home in Utah where the dry climate is ideal for candy making. In 1874 the couple settled in Provo, Utah where their store quickly became a popular attraction. The original factory is a historic building located in Provo, Utah that is listed on the National Register of Historic Places. The first candy bars in the United States were produced here. The Startup Candy Company has passed through five generations of Startups and has moved to three different locations. 

In 2021, the store re-located to American Fork, Utah. Employees use the same recipes and passion for candy-making to create a one-of-a-kind and old-fashioned candies and suckers.

Startup Candy Factory

Company 
The Startup Candy company was founded by William Startup. He built the factory at 534 South 100 West in 1900 to help expand the family business. One of the first candy companies in Utah, the Startup Candy Company thrived in Utah's dry climate. The company produced the first candy bars in the U.S., as well as being the first to produce and sell ice cream. This facility helped Utah produce more candy than the rest of the Intermountain States combined. The Startup Candy Company was the first company in Utah state to introduce profit sharing to its employees.

The Startup Candy Factory was added to the Provo City Historic Landmarks registry on March 21, 1996.

Structure
A mix between a warehouse style, and a light commercial style, the Startup Candy Factory has two stories and a basement. The southern portion of the structure is fairly plain with no decorative elements adorning the outside, it displays an asymmetrical facade. The middle section is more decorative, with a Roman arched door bay and a stone belt course, as well as recessed brick panels encasing window and door bays. The northern section has a corbled brick course along the second level.

William Daw Startup family
Born to William Startup and Selina Morris in Widcombe, England, on September 8, 1846, William helped his father make candy as a child, beneath their retail store in the basement. After William converted to the Church of Jesus Christ of Latter-day Saints, he alone out of his family immigrated to the United States. On November 14, 1869 William wed Hagar in Salt Lake City's Endowment House. Once married, William and Hagar settled in Salt Lake, hoping that William would be able to make a living as a teacher. In the year 1874, they moved to Provo, and in 1875, they began making candy in a factory they constructed next to their home. William was hit by a limestone cooling slab, which caused his untimely death in the year 1878.

Hagar, his wife, had four children by that time, and endeavored to carry on the candy making business in their support. By 1892, the store was a success, and became the third wholesale manufacturing company in the state of Utah. Three years later, Hagar's sons Walter, George, and William became the owners. In 1896, the first candy bar in the United States, the opera bar, was sold for ten cents from this factory. When the depression hit and economic difficulties ensued, Walter Startup purchased his brothers’ interests, but soon lost them to the bank. Eventually, additional funds were procured, and Walter was able to buy back the northern half of the factory, where the company continued to operate.

It was listed on the National Register of Historic Places in 1983.

See also

 National Register of Historic Places listings in Utah County, Utah

References

Additional reading
  2002. "Historic Provo" Provo City Landmarks Commission.
 Hinckley, Ann.  “Utah Historic Sites Inventory Form.”  Utah Historical Society.  July 1975.
 Hartman, Cheryl.  National Park Service. "National Register of Historic Places Inventory -- Nomination Form." May 1983.

External links

 NRHP Listings in Provo Utah

Commercial buildings on the National Register of Historic Places in Utah
National Register of Historic Places in Provo, Utah